Felix Gasselich (born 21 December 1955) is an Austrian former footballer who played as a midfielder for Austria Wien, Ajax, LASK Linz, Wiener SC, Grazer AK, Kremser SC and SR Donaufeld Wien, as well as for the Austrian national side.

References

1955 births
Living people
Austrian footballers
FK Austria Wien players
AFC Ajax players
LASK players
Grazer AK players
Austrian Football Bundesliga players
Eredivisie players
Austria international footballers
Austrian expatriate footballers
Expatriate footballers in the Netherlands
Austrian expatriate sportspeople in the Netherlands
Footballers from Vienna
Association football midfielders